Charles Langmaid Cragin III (born October 9, 1943) is an American politician from  Maine. He was the Republican nominee for governor of Maine in 1982, losing in a landslide to Democratic incumbent Gov. Joseph E. Brennan. Afterwards, Cragin was a Republican National Committee member from Maine from 1983 to 1990, and as acting U.S. Under Secretary of Defense for Personnel and Readiness in 2000.

Cragin also was the first Senate-confirmed chairman of the Board of Veterans' Appeals in the U.S. Department of Veterans' Affairs.

Education
He received a Bachelor of Science in Education from the University of Maine in 1967 and a Juris Doctor from the University of Maine School of Law in 1970.

Military service
He enlisted in the United States Navy in 1961 and was on active duty and in the Navy Reserve until his retirement as a Captain in 1998. For his military service he was awarded the Legion of Merit and many other medals.

Early career
From 1964 to 1969 he was an announcer and newsman for WIDE Radio, WPOR Radio, and WSCH Radio & TV. All based in Biddeford and Portland. In 1969 he was a research assistant for Peat, Marwick, Mitchell & Co.

Legal career
From 1969 to 1990 he practiced law with Verrill and Dana in Portland.

Federal service
In 1990, he was nominated by President George H. W. Bush and confirmed by the United States Senate in 1991 as Chairman of the Board of Veterans' Appeals of the Department of Veterans Affairs.

He later served in several senior capacities in the Department of Defense including Acting Under Secretary of Defense for Personnel & Readiness (2000), Principal Deputy Under Secretary for Personnel & Readiness, Acting Assistant Secretary of Defense for Reserve Affairs (1998-2001), and Acting Assistant to the Secretary of Defense for Civil Support.

Later career
After retiring from federal service in 2001, he became a partner in the Washington, DC office of Blank Rome, LLP. In 2003 he joined System Planning Corporation (SPC) of Arlington, Virginia as its Senior Vice President for National Intelligence, Security and Response. He continues to serve as Senior Advisor to the CEO of SPC.

He served as Chairman of the Advisory Committee on Gulf War Veterans from 2008 to 2009.

Political candidacy
He sought the Republican nomination for Governor of Maine in 1978 and 1982. He sought the Republican nomination for Attorney General of Maine in 1979.

He was a Republican candidate for Governor of Maine in 1982.

References 

1943 births
Living people
Politicians from Portland, Maine
Maine Republicans
University of Maine alumni
University of Maine School of Law alumni
Republican National Committee members
United States Department of Defense officials
20th-century American politicians
Recipients of the Legion of Merit
United States Navy officers
United States Navy reservists